Kilobaud may refer to:

One thousand baud
P.H.I.R.M., a 1980s computer hacking group originally known as Kilobaud
Kilobaud Microcomputing, a homebrew computer magazine from the 1980s